Medisave is a national medical savings account system in Singapore, introduced in April 1984. The contribution is mandatory and taken from the monthly Central Provident Fund (CPF) contribution. The system allows Singaporeans to put aside part of their income into a Medisave account to meet future personal or immediate family's hospitalization, day surgery and for certain outpatient expenses.

Under this system, Singaporean employees contributes depending on age group, 6.5–9.0% of their monthly salaries to a personal Medisave account. The savings can be withdrawn to pay the hospital bills of the account holder and their immediate family members.

See also
 Healthcare in Singapore

References

External links
 MediSave

Healthcare in Singapore
1984 establishments in Singapore